is a train station of West Japan Railway Company (JR-West) in Nara, Nara Prefecture, Japan. Although the station is on the Sakurai Line as rail infrastructure, it has been served by the Man-yō Mahoroba Line since 2010 in terms of passenger train services.

Lines

Layout

Platforms

External links
 Official website 

Railway stations in Japan opened in 1898
Railway stations in Nara Prefecture
Buildings and structures in Nara, Nara